The Tribute Power Station is a conventional hydroelectric power station located in Western Tasmania, Australia.

Technical details
Part of the PiemanAnthony Power Development scheme that comprises four hydroelectric power stations, the Tribute Power Station is the first station in the scheme, being the highest upstream, yet the last major hydro-electric power development in Tasmania. The power station is located underground, below the -high rock-filled concrete faced Anthony Dam and the adjacent -high Anthony Levee, both across the Anthony River which forms Lake Plimsoll. Water from the lake is fed to the power station via a  headrace tunnel.

The station output, estimated to be  annually, is fed to TasNetworks' transmission grid via a 13.8 kV/220 kV Fuji surface generator transformer to the outdoor switchyard.

Although the Tribute Power Station might have been the last major construction project of the Hydro Electric Commission of Tasmania, the 1,000 GWH Project has resulted in upgrades to component parts of existing superstructure operated by Hydro Tasmania.

See also 

List of power stations in Tasmania

References

External links

Energy infrastructure completed in 1994
Hydroelectric power stations in Tasmania
Pieman River Power Development